Glen D. Johnson Jr. (born April 20, 1954) is the former Chancellor of the Oklahoma State System of Higher Education, succeeded by Allison Garrett a state system comprising 25 state colleges and universities, 10 constituent agencies, one higher education center and independent colleges and universities coordinated with the state system.

Early life and education
Born in Oklahoma City, Johnson is the son of former U.S. Congressman Glen D. Johnson Sr. and Imogene Johnson. He graduated from Muskogee High School in 1972. He completed his bachelor's degree in political science at the University of Oklahoma and then obtained his Juris Doctor from the Oklahoma City University School of Law. During his college years, he was a member of the Phi Beta Kappa Society and is currently serves on the National Foundation board of directors of the Alpha Tau Omega Fraternity.

Career
Johnson founded Oklahoma Foundation for Excellence in 1986 and previously was a member of the Oklahoma Hall of Fame's Executive Board of Directors and the Oklahoma State Fair Board of Directors respectively.

From 1982 to 1996, Johnson was a member of the Oklahoma House of Representatives, and, in 1990, became Speaker of the State House at age 36, the youngest in the state's history (at the time). Johnson is the 8th Chancellor of the Oklahoma State System of Higher Education having assumed the position in January, 2007. He previously served ten years as the 16th president of Southeastern Oklahoma State University in Durant, Oklahoma. In 2012, Johnson was elected to the Southern Regional Education Board of which he still a vice chairman. In 2014, the Association of Governing Boards of Universities and Colleges have appointed Johnson to its Council of Presidents and the same year he was elected to the State Higher Education Executive Officers' Executive Committee.

In 2019, Johnson announced his retirement, which began in fall of 2020.

Personal life
Glen Johnson Jr. lives in Oklahoma City with his wife Melinda Pierce, a school teacher at Edmond Memorial High School. Johnson was inducted into the Oklahoma Hall of Fame in 2006 and ten years later was also inducted into the Oklahoma Higher Education Hall of Fame. Johnson was succeeded as President of the Durant campus by Michael D. Turner.

References

1954 births
Living people
Heads of Oklahoma state agencies
Politicians from Oklahoma City
Presidents of Southeastern Oklahoma State University
Speakers of the Oklahoma House of Representatives
20th-century American politicians